Nebria viridipennis is a species of black coloured ground beetle from Nebriinae subfamily that can be found in Georgia and Russia.

References

viridipennis
Beetles described in 1885
Beetles of Asia